One third of South Lakeland District Council in Cumbria, England is elected each year, followed by one year without election. Since the last boundary changes in 2008, 51 councillors have been elected from 45 wards.

Political control
Since the first election to the council in 1973 political control of the council has been held by the following parties:

Leadership
The leaders of the council since 2001 have been:

Council elections
1973 South Lakeland District Council election
1976 South Lakeland District Council election
1979 South Lakeland District Council election (New ward boundaries)
1980 South Lakeland District Council election
1982 South Lakeland District Council election
1983 South Lakeland District Council election
1984 South Lakeland District Council election
1986 South Lakeland District Council election
1987 South Lakeland District Council election
1988 South Lakeland District Council election
1990 South Lakeland District Council election (District boundary changes took place but the number of seats remained the same)
1991 South Lakeland District Council election
1992 South Lakeland District Council election
1994 South Lakeland District Council election
1995 South Lakeland District Council election
1996 South Lakeland District Council election
1998 South Lakeland District Council election
1999 South Lakeland District Council election (New ward boundaries)
2000 South Lakeland District Council election
2002 South Lakeland District Council election
2003 South Lakeland District Council election
2004 South Lakeland District Council election
2006 South Lakeland District Council election
2007 South Lakeland District Council election
2008 South Lakeland District Council election (New ward boundaries reduced the number of seats by 1)
2010 South Lakeland District Council election
2011 South Lakeland District Council election
2012 South Lakeland District Council election
2014 South Lakeland District Council election
2015 South Lakeland District Council election
2016 South Lakeland District Council election
2018 South Lakeland District Council election (New ward boundaries)
2019 South Lakeland District Council election

District result maps

By-election results

1997-2001

2001-2005

2009-2015

2015-2021

References

 By-election results

External links
South Lakeland Council

 
South Lakeland District
Council elections in Cumbria
District council elections in England